Kenya Kasahara (笠原 謙哉, born 15 May 1988) is a Japanese handball player for Hörður and the Japanese national team. He represented Japan at the 2019 World Men's Handball Championship and at the 2020 Summer Olympics.

Club career
In July 2021, Kasahara signed with Hörður of the Icelandic 1. deild karla. He helped Hörður finish first in the 1. deild in 2022, and achieve promotion to the top-tier Úrvalsdeild karla.

Titles
1. deild karla: 2022

References

1988 births
Living people
Japanese male handball players
Handball players at the 2018 Asian Games
Asian Games competitors for Japan
Handball players at the 2020 Summer Olympics
21st-century Japanese people